Trichorrhexis nodosa is a defect in the hair shaft characterized by thickening or weak points (nodes) that cause the hair to break off easily. This group of conditions contributes to the appearance of hair loss, lack of growth, and damaged-looking hair.

Symptoms
Among the symptoms (and signs) for this condition are the following:
 lack of apparent hair growth
 hair appears patchy
 hair breaks easily close to scalp
 hair may have thickenings or nodes in the shaft
 ends of hair thinned or split
 whitish discoloration of hair tips
 hair breaks easily at tips

Complications
This condition is not dangerous but may affect self-esteem.

Causes
Trichorrhexis may have a genetic basis but appears to be precipitated by environmental factors. Among Caucasians the defect often appears at the ends of the hair shaft with splitting of the ends, thinning and whitish discoloration.

These conditions are directly related to environmental causes such as "perming", blow drying, aggressive hair brushing, and excessive chemical exposure.

In some cases, trichorrhexis nodosa may be caused by an underlying disorder such as argininosuccinic aciduria, Menkes' kinky hair syndrome, Netherton's syndrome, hypothyroidism,  or trichothiodystrophy.

Diagnosis
Examination of the hair shafts with a microscope may reveal changes of trichorrhexis nodosa.

Prevention
Avoid aggressive brushing and grooming, strong chemicals, permanents, straightening, and similar hair-damaging habits.

Treatment
Improving environmental factors will reduce damage to the hair. Gentle brushing with a soft brush should replace more aggressive brushing, ratting, or other procedures. Harsh chemicals such as hair straightening compounds and permanents should be avoided. The hair should not be ironed. Excessively harsh shampoo should be avoided. Hair conditioners should be used.

Prognosis
This condition is self-limiting. Improvements in grooming techniques and in environmental conditions will correct the abnormality.

See also 
 Trichomegaly
 Infrared Heat & Negative Ion Straighteners
 List of cutaneous conditions

Notes

References

External links 

Conditions of the skin appendages